Onatejiro "AJ" Odudu (born 12 February 1988) is a British television presenter from Blackburn, England. She is best known for co-presenting the 2013 Channel 5 reality show spin-off Big Brother's Bit on the Side, alongside Emma Willis and Rylan Clark and the 2021 Channel 4 reality show spin off Married at First Sight: Afters.

Early life and education
Odudu was born in Blackburn, Lancashire. Her mother, Florence, and father, James, are Nigerian and she is one of eight children (five boys and three girls). Her parents had an arranged marriage, for which her mother immigrated to England from Nigeria in the 1970s. Her father worked as a bus conductor, and her mother worked as a seamstress, cleaner, and dinner lady at a private school.

Odudu attended St Bede's RC High School and St Mary's College in Blackburn. She later graduated with a degree in English and Politics from Keele University.

Career
Odudu began her career as a reporter for BBC Blast based at Radio Lancashire. Her first presenting roles began in 2009 on the BBC Two series The Almost Perfect Guide to Life and on The 5:19 Show, an online show on the BBC website, having previously served as the latter's 'raving reporter'. In 2010, she was a guest on 100 Greatest Toys, a one-off special broadcast on Channel 4. She starred as herself in Comedy Lab in 2011 and co-presented Sky Arts' coverage of the Isle of Wight Festival 2012.

In June 2013, Odudu began presenting Big Brother's Bit on the Side with Rylan Clark-Neal and Emma Willis, and then Celebrity Big Brother's Bit on the Psych from August 2013. Her departure from the show was confirmed in November 2013, being replaced by Celebrity Big Brother 12 contestant and former Loose Women panellist, Carol McGiffin. In August 2013, Odudu launched her own blog on Hello magazine's UK website. From 2015 to 2019, Odudu hosted the 4Music programme Trending Live!, with Jimmy Hill and Vick Hope.

She regularly presented the online Facebook quiz game "Confetti" in March and April 2019.

In July 2021, she won the second series of Celebrity Karaoke Club on ITV2. Also in that month, Odudu was confirmed as co-host of a one-off revival edition of The Big Breakfast, presenting alongside the already-announced Mo Gilligan, for Channel 4 in September 2021.

In March 2022, she co-hosted The Great Comic Relief Prizeathon alongside Vernon Kay. 

Odudu presented the UK jury points in the Eurovision Song Contest 2022. In June 2022 she was a presenter for the BBC's coverage of the Platinum Jubilee Pageant. On 10 January 2023, it was announced that Odudu would co-host the official handover and semi-final allocation draw for the Eurovision Song Contest 2023 that will be broadcast live on BBC Two.

Strictly Come Dancing
From September 2021, she was a competitor on the nineteenth series of Strictly Come Dancing, partnered with professional dancer Kai Widdrington. They topped the leaderboard in their first week with a score of 34, and again in week 7, when they scored 39 for their Charleston to "Don't Bring Lulu". The couple also jointly topped the leaderboard in the semi-final, but were forced to withdraw from the competition on 17 December, the day before the final, after Odudu tore a ligament in her right ankle.

Time For A Check In 
On Tuesday 27th September 2022, she will host in a multiplatform campaign with Channel 4 who have partnered with Benenden Health. She will be encouraging the people of the United Kingdom to open up about their health and discussing physical health, mental health and menopause. In the episode The Most Awkward Thing To See A GP About AJ spoke to John Junior about a chronic condition in which she took him to speak to Dr Sarah Hattam in their pop up clinic.

Personal life
Odudu lives in southeast London. She is a qualified personal trainer and sports nutritionist, and runs in her spare time.

Filmography

References

External links 

1988 births
Alumni of Keele University
BBC television presenters
English bloggers
English television presenters
English people of Nigerian descent
Living people
People from Blackburn
Black British television personalities
British women bloggers